"Signs of Love Makin" is a song by American singer Tyrese from his third studio album I Wanna Go There (2002). It was written by Gibson, Harvey Mason Jr. and Damon Thomas, while production was helmed by Mason and Thomas under their production moniker The Underdogs. Released as the album's second and final single following his hit single "How You Gonna Act Like That", the song peaked at number 57 on the US Billboard Hot 100 and number 18 on the US Hot R&B/Hip-Hop Songs.

Track listings

Credits and personnel
 Eric Dawkins – backing vocals
 Tyrese Gibson – vocals, writer
 Eric Jackson – guitar
 Jolie Levine-Aller – coordinator 
 Harvey Mason Jr. – producer, writer
 Dave "Natural Love" Russell – mixing
 Damon Thomas – producer, writer

Charts

Weekly charts

Year-end charts

References

2003 songs
Tyrese Gibson songs
RCA Records singles
2000s ballads
Contemporary R&B ballads
Song recordings produced by the Underdogs (production team)
Songs written by Damon Thomas (record producer)
Songs written by Harvey Mason Jr.
Songs written by Tyrese Gibson